Saum is an unincorporated community in Beltrami County, Minnesota, United States.

Notable person
Leroy E. Matson, Minnesota Supreme Court justice, grew up on a farm in Saum.

References

Unincorporated communities in Beltrami County, Minnesota
Unincorporated communities in Minnesota